The State University of Maringá (UEM) is a public university whose main campus is in Maringá, Paraná, Brazil. It was founded in 1970 and recognized in 1976 by the Federal Government of Brazil. Its academic population is estimated in 18,000 people among professors, undergraduates, graduate students and manager technicals.

UEM has 48 undergraduate courses and about 25 graduate programs. The university has 5 campuses in Maringá, Goioere, Cianorte, Cidade Gaúcha and Umuarama, all cities located in Paraná state.

See also
Brazil University Rankings
Universities and Higher Education in Brazil

References

External links 
Official website (in Portuguese)

Maringá
Educational institutions established in 1970
1970 establishments in Brazil
Paraná
Universities and colleges in Paraná